Catherine Nelson (born Catherine Seeley, 26 November 1987) is a Sinn Féin politician from Northern Ireland. She was an MLA for Upper Bann from the 2016 election until 2017.

Previously a schoolteacher at the non-denominational Belfast Boys' Model School, she resigned after allegedly enduring a campaign of harassment, which began after she was co-opted as a Sinn Féin councillor on Craigavon Borough Council in 2014. The Protestant Coalition opposed her employment at the school over her affiliation with Sinn Féin.

On 16 January 2017, it was announced she would not seeking re-election at the 2017 assembly election and would return to work as a schoolteacher.

In 2018, she was co-opted as a councillor onto Armagh City, Banbridge and Craigavon Borough Council.

References

1987 births
Living people
Sinn Féin MLAs
Northern Ireland MLAs 2016–2017
Alumni of Queen's University Belfast
People from Lurgan
Members of Craigavon Borough Council
Female members of the Northern Ireland Assembly
Schoolteachers from Northern Ireland
Sinn Féin councillors in Northern Ireland
Sinn Féin parliamentary candidates
Women councillors in Northern Ireland